Compsosoma geayi is a species of beetle in the family Cerambycidae. It was described by Gounelle in 1908. It is known from Brazil and French Guiana.

References

Compsosomatini
Beetles described in 1908